Assuta Ashdod Medical Center is a general hospital in Ashdod, Israel. It began operation on June 4, 2017, and was opened in stages, assuming full operation in November 2017. The hospital has 300 beds and serves the population of Ashdod and its suburbs.

For decades the local government of Ashdod struggled to establish a public hospital. Ashdod residents in need of hospitalization needed to travel to Kaplan Medical Center in Rehovot or Barzilai Medical Center in Ashkelon. In 2002 the Knesset accepted a law proposed by MK Sofa Landver which forced the state to build the hospital. However the tender was released only in 2009. Despite multiple objections the tender was won by Assuta (a subsidiary of Maccabi Healthcare Services).

Assuta Ashdod has partnered with Ben Gurion University's Medical School to train Israel's next generation of doctors. The hospital is fully prepared for security crises, including terrorist incidents and rocket attacks. Its “bomb-shelter” design with thick concrete walls offers extensive protection, with no need to move patients from operating rooms, ICU, inpatient wards, and other critical areas in the event of a missile attack. Assuta Ashdod is Israel’s first eco-friendly hospital, meeting  standards for green construction and operations.

See also
Healthcare in Israel

References

External links
 
 "Healthcare in Israel Heats up" Jerusalem Post, May 4, 2017

Hospitals in Israel
Ashdod
Hospitals established in 2017
Hospital buildings completed in 2017
Buildings and structures in Ashdod
2017 establishments in Israel